Conoderus collaris or Prodrasterius collaris, is a species of click beetle found in Indian subregion from Pakistan, Assam to Sri Lanka.

References 

Elmidae
Insects of Sri Lanka
Insects described in 1859